Škaljari is a small town in the municipality of Kotor, Montenegro. It is located just south of Kotor town.

Demographics
According to the 2003 census, the town had a population of 4,002.

According to the 2011 census, its population was 3,807.

References

Populated places in Kotor Municipality